Zelenika may refer to:
 Zelenika Peak, Antarctica
 Zelenika, Živinice, a village in Živinice, Bosnia and Herzegovina
 Zelenika, Gabrovo Province, Bulgaria
 Zelenika, Herceg Novi, Montenegro